Damien Bower (born 17 June 1980) is an Australian former professional rugby league footballer who played in the 2000s, he played in the National Rugby League (NRL) for the St. George Illawarra Dragons.

References

1980 births
Australian rugby league players
St. George Illawarra Dragons players
Living people
Rugby league five-eighths
Place of birth missing (living people)